Direct colonial rule is a form of colonialism that involves the establishment of a centralized foreign authority within a territory, which is run by colonial officials. According to Michael W. Doyle of  Harvard University, in a system of direct rule, the native population is excluded from all but the lowest level of the colonial government. Ugandan academic Mahmood Mamdani classifies direct rule as centralized despotism: a system where natives were not considered citizens.

The opposite of direct colonial rule is indirect rule, which integrates pre-established local elites and native institutions into the government.

See also

President's rule
Analysis of Western European colonialism and colonization
Environmental determinism

References 

Colonialism
French colonial empire